The ordeal of the bitter water was a trial by ordeal administered to the wife whose husband suspected her of adultery but who had no witnesses to make a formal case. The ordeal is expanded in the Talmud, in the seventh tractate of Nashim.

According to Rabbinic Judaism, a sotah (  / סוטה) is a woman suspected of adultery who undergoes the ordeal of bitter water or ordeal of jealousy as described and prescribed in the Priestly Code, in the Book of Numbers, the fourth book of the Hebrew Bible. The term sotah itself is not found in the Hebrew Bible but is Mishnaic Hebrew based on the verse "if she has strayed" (verb: שטה satah) in Numbers 5:12.

According to Tikva Frymer-Kensky, the ritual is not actually an "ordeal" which provides a verdict on the woman's guilt for use by human judges, but rather takes the form of a "purgatory oath, in which the individual swearing the oath puts himself under divine jurisdiction, expecting to be punished by God if the oath-taker is guilty".

Hebrew Bible
The account of the ordeal of bitter water is given in the Book of Numbers:

The ordeal
When a man suspects his wife of having sex with another man but has no witnesses, the woman is brought to a kohen (priest), or before God.

The woman is required by the biblical passage to have loosened hair during the ritual. This is often taken to be a symbol of the woman's supposed shame, but according to Josephus, it was merely the standard behaviour for anyone accused of any crime, when they appeared before the Sanhedrin.

The husband was required to make a sacrifice to God as part of the ritual, probably due to a general principle that no one should seek answers from God without giving something in return. This offering is placed in the wife's hands, and is literally described as her offering for her. Scholars think that it is the man's offering, in relation to the ordeal of his wife, and that her holding of it is merely symbolic of this.

The offering specified is one tenth of an ephah of barley meal, unaccompanied by oil or frankincense; this is the cheaper type of flour, unlike the flour specified for all other biblical sacrifices. The specification is now thought to be a rare survival of an earlier period, in which there was no restriction on the types of flour which could be used for sacrifices, although the Mishnah argues that it was a reference to the bestial nature of adultery, coarse flour being the food of beasts.

The ordeal consisted of the wife having to drink a specific potion administered by the priest. The text specifies that the potion should be made from water and dust. In the Masoretic Text, the water used for the potion must be holy water, and the Targum interprets it as water from the Molten Sea, but the Septuagint instead requires running water. The passage states that the curse was washed into the water; it is thought that this idea derives from a belief that the words of a curse exist in their own right. Others argue that the curse is a euphemism for a miscarriage or infertility.

The potion also had to be mixed in an earthenware vessel. This may have been because the potion was regarded as impure, and therefore also made the vessel impure, necessitating its subsequent destruction (see ). However, the Talmud and Rashi explain that this vessel is chosen to contrast the woman's predicament with her behavior. She gave the adulterer to drink choice wine in valuable goblets; therefore, let her drink bitter water in a worthless clay vessel.

If the woman was unharmed by the bitter water, the rules regard her as innocent of the accusation. The account in the Book of Numbers states that the man shall be free from blame (5:26).

The punishment

In cases of guilt, the text does not specify the amount of time needed for the potion to take effect; 19th century scholars suspected it was probably intended to have a fairly immediate effect. Maimonides records the traditional rabbinical view: "Her belly swells first and then her thigh ruptures and she dies". Others maintain that since the word "thigh" is often used in the Bible as a euphemism for various reproductive organs, in this case it may mean the uterus, the placenta or an embryo, and the woman would survive.

Several commentaries on the Bible maintain that the ordeal is to be applied in the case of a woman who has become pregnant, allegedly by her extramarital lover. In this interpretation, the bitter potion could be an abortifacient, inducing a purposeful abortion or miscarriage if the woman is pregnant with a child which her husband alleges is another man's. If the fetus aborts as a result of the ordeal, this presumably confirms her guilt of adultery, otherwise her innocence is presumed if the fetus does not abort. One translation to follow this suggestion is the New International Version, which translates that the effect of the bitter water on an adulterous woman will be to make "your womb miscarry and your abdomen swell".  Such a translation is effectively reading the Hebrew word yarek (יָרֵך) to mean "loins", a meaning it can carry.

However, Tikva Frymer-Kensky rejected this interpretation on the grounds that the Biblical text does not limit the ordeal to pregnant women, and that the phrase venizreah zera ("she shall be sown with seed", the reward given to an innocent woman after the trial) refers to conception rather than delivery. Instead, Frymer-Kensky argues that the punishment "your belly will swell and your thigh will fall" most likely refers to a uterine prolapse.

In rabbinic literature 
According to the Mishnah, it was the practice for the woman to first be brought to the Sanhedrin, before being subjected to the ordeal. Repeated attempts would be made to persuade the woman to confess, including multiple suggestions to her of possible mitigating factors; if she confessed, the ordeal was not required. The Mishnah reports that, in the time of the Second Temple, she was taken to the East Gate of the Temple, in front of the Nikanor gate.

The Mishnah also states that the garment she was wearing was ripped to expose her heart. A rope was tied above her breasts so that her clothes did not completely fall off.

The Mishnah mentions that while a guilty woman would normally die immediately from the trial, her death could also be delayed by one, two or three years, if she possessed offsetting merits.

Nachmanides points out that of all the 613 commandments, it is only the sotah law that requires God's specific co-operation to make it work. The bitter waters can only be effective miraculously.

Maimonides wrote: "When she dies, the adulterer because of whom she was compelled to drink will also die, wherever he is located. The same phenomena, the swelling of the belly and the rupture of the thigh, will also occur to him. All the above applies provided her husband never engaged in forbidden sexual relations in his life. If, however, her husband ever engaged in forbidden relations, the [bitter] waters do not check [the fidelity of] his wife."

Cessation of the ordeal
According to Mishnah, the practice was abolished some time during the first century CE under the leadership of Yohanan ben Zakkai. If it had not been abolished then according to Jewish Law the ritual would have ceased with the fall of the Temple (in approximately the year 70 CE), as it should not have been performed elsewhere. Explanations in rabbinical literature vary concerning cessation of the practice. Yohanan Ben Zakkai stated:

Rav Hanina of Sura said:

Christian references
Although the actual ordeal was not practiced in Christianity it was referenced by Christian writers through the ages in relation to both the subject of adultery, and also the wider practice of trial by ordeal. Additionally, some early Christian legends, such as the Gospel of Pseudo-Matthew, embroider the life of Mary, mother of Jesus with accounts including Mary (and even Joseph) undergoing a version of the ordeal.

Textual analysis 

Biblical critics from the 19th and early 20th centuries argued, based on certain textual features in the passage, that it was formed by the combination of two earlier texts. For example, the text appears to suggest first that the offering should occur before the ordeal, and then that it should occur after it. Due to the awkwardness of the idea that the wife has to drink the potion twice, textual scholars argue that either the first drinking must be a later addition to the text, or that the whole account of the ordeal must be spliced together from two earlier descriptions.

Similarly, noting that there are two descriptions of the location for the ritual (in the presence of a priest and before Yahweh) and two occasions on which the punishment for the woman is mentioned ( and ), the division into two earlier documents, first suggested by Bernhard Stade is typically as follows:
 one account is the ordeal and sacrifice before God, in which the possible miscarriage/abortion results from drinking the potion;
 the other is merely a condemnation by a priest, in which the woman stands with hair loosened, her guilt is assumed, and divine intervention (due to the priest's involvement) will cause a miscarriage/abortion as punishment.

Other early biblical scholars thought that the ordeal is itself a fusion of two earlier rituals (pre-dating the original priestly text), one using water, and the other dust. The use of dust might be connected to necromancy. In other historic Semitic cultures there are many instances in which holy water was regarded as taboo, and therefore that contact with it, or its consumption, was dangerous.

However, recent Biblical scholars have recognized that whatever "literary prehistory" the text may have had, it now has a unified structure, and the repetitions in the text are simply examples of typical Biblical style rather than proof of multiple authorship.

Similar rituals 
Trials by ordeal are found in other societies of the ancient Near East such as in the Laws of Hammurabi (§132).

Pre-Islamic Arabic culture similarly had an adultery ordeal, although in scientific terms, compared to the Israelite ritual it relied more on nausea, than on directly poisoning the woman. In this pre-Islamic Arabic ritual, the woman simply took oaths attesting to her innocence, and asking the divinity to cause her to have a miscarriage/abortion, should she be lying.

Ordeals involving the risk of harm, including potential injury resulting from the drinking of certain potions, were common in antiquity; in parts of Europe, their judicial use even lasted until the late Middle Ages. Such ordeals were once believed to result in a direct decision by a deity, about the guilt or innocence of the party/parties undertaking the ordeal; typically divine intervention was believed to prevent the innocent from being harmed, or to ensure that the guilty were.

Modern applications
According to scholars such as Helena Zlotnick, after the ordeal of bitter water was no longer practiced it remained a reference point in the search for replacements for the test of adultery.

See also

 Jewish views of marriage
 Nocebo
 Women in Judaism

References

Further reading
 .
 Daniel Friedmann: From the Trial of Adam and Eve to the Judgments of Solomon and Daniel
 Luzia Sutter Rehmann: "The Doorway into Freedom - The Case of the 'Suspected Wife' in Romans 7.1-6" in Journal for the Study of the New Testament (JSNT) no 79, 91-104.

Book of Numbers
Hebrew Bible words and phrases
Jewish marital law
Judaism and abortion
Positive Mitzvoth
Sexual fidelity
Trial by ordeal